Getta turrenti is a moth of the  family Notodontidae. It is found in southeastern Mexico (Veracruz, Chiapas) and Guatemala.

External links
Species page at Tree of Life project

Notodontidae
Moths described in 2009